The Bahrain national futsal team represents Bahrain in international futsal competitions and is controlled by the Bahrain Football Association.

Tournaments

FIFA Futsal World Cup

AFC Futsal Championship

WAFF Futsal Championship

Players

Current squad
Players called for the 2018 AFC Futsal Championship.

Previous squads

AFC Futsal Championship
2018 AFC Futsal Championship squads

References

Asian national futsal teams
Futsal
Football in Bahrain